This is a list of sailing frigates of the United States Navy. Frigates were the backbone of the early Navy, although the list shows that many suffered unfortunate fates.

The sailing frigates of the United States built from 1797 on were unique in that their framing was made of American live oak, a particularly hardy genus that made very resilient hulls; as a result of this, the ships were known to withstand damage that would have scuppered frigates of other nations. American frigates were also very heavily armed; the USN's 44s carried 24-pound cannon as opposed to the 18-pounders usual in frigates, and like most ships of the period carried more than their nominal rate, 56 guns or more. On the other hand, the USN classed ships with 20 to 26 guns as "third-class frigates", whereas the Royal Navy did not.

Continental Navy
Congress authorized 3 frigates of 18, 13 frigates of 12 ( 5 of 32, 5 of 28 and 3 of 24)

United States Navy

Ten additional ships of the Potomac class were appropriated, but never built.

See also
List of sloops of war of the United States Navy
Bibliography of early United States naval history
Continental Navy
Pages that link to this list

References
 Chapelle, Howard Irving. The History of the American Sailing Navy; The Ships and Their Development. New York: Norton, 1949.
 Retrieved from "List of sloops of war of the United States Navy"

Citations 

 
Sailing frigates
United States sailing frigates